The Hofuku Maru,  briefly known as Taifuku Maru No. 31 during construction, was a Japanese Dai-ichi Taifuku Maru-class cargo ship, torpedoed and sunk on September 21, 1944 by US Navy carrier aircraft, while carrying 1,289 British and Dutch prisoners of war (POWs); 1,047 of them died.

The Hōfuku Maru was sailing from Singapore to Miri, Borneo as part of convoy SHIMI-05. The convoy consisted of 10 ships, 5 of which carried, in total, 5,000 POWs, all in appalling conditions.
 
At Borneo, the Hōfuku Maru left the convoy with engine problems, and sailed on to the Philippines, arriving on July 19. She remained in Manila until mid-September while the engines were repaired. The POWs remained on board, suffering terribly from disease, hunger, and thirst.

On September 20, 1944, the Hōfuku Maru and 10 other ships formed Convoy MATA-27, and sailed from Manila to Japan. The following morning, the convoy was attacked 80 miles north of Corregidor by more than 100 American carrier aircraft. All eleven ships in the convoy were sunk. Of those on the Hōfuku Maru, 1,047 of the 1,289 British and Dutch POWs on board died. 242 POWs made swam to shore and 42 were rescued by kaibokans.

Following the end of the First World War the ship had been used to repatriate German prisoners of war, many of whom had been held in Bandō prisoner-of-war camp. Most of the prisoners had been taken after the Siege of Tsingtao in 1914.

References

 Tsingtao (in German)
 Wreck site
 Jack Earnshaw
 Roll of Honour

1918 ships
Ships built by Kawasaki Heavy Industries
World War II merchant ships of Japan
Ships sunk by US aircraft
Maritime incidents in September 1944
Japanese hell ships